John North may refer to:

Politicians
John North (died 1597) (1551–1597), MP for Cambridgeshire, Cambridge and Orford
John North (City of York MP) (1495–1558), Member of Parliament for City of York
John W. North (1815–1890), U.S. statesman and pioneer
John North (Oxfordshire MP) (1802–1894), British politician
John B. North (1825–1907), shipbuilder and political figure in Nova Scotia, Canada

Sportsmen
John North (billiards player), World Champion of English billiards in the 20th century, see World Professional Billiards Championship
John North (American football) (1921–2010), original Baltimore Colts player and New Orleans Saints head coach
John North (cricketer) (born 1970), former English cricketer

Others
John A. North (classicist), British historian 
John Britty North (1831–1917), English-born stockbroker and mining entrepreneur in Australia, known as the 'Father of Katoomba' 
John North (Trinity) (1645–1683), Master of Trinity College, Cambridge 1677–1683
John Henry North (c. 1788–1831), British politician
John Thomas North (1842–1896), British investor and businessman, known as 'The Nitrate King'
John North (historian) (1934–2008), British historian of science
John Ringling North (1903–1985), owner of the Ringling Bros. and Barnum & Bailey Circus
John William North (1842–1924), English landscape painter and illustrator
John North (theologian) (1871–1950), New Zealand Baptist minister, editor and theological college principal
John Dudley North (1893–1968), chairman and managing director of Boulton Paul Aircraft
John Gunder North (1826–1872), Norwegian-born ship builder in San Francisco